Alisher Tuychiev (born 8 March 1976) is Tajikistani football player of Uzbek descent.

Career

Club
Tuychiev was released by FC Istiklol at the end of the 2015 season. On 4 January 2016, Tuychiev was registered by FK Khujand for their 2016 AFC Cup campaign.

Career statistics

Club

International

Statistics accurate as of match played 24 March 2016

Honours

Club
Parvoz Bobojon Ghafurov
Tajik Cup (1): 2007
Istiklol
Tajik League (3): 2011, 2014, 2015
Tajik Cup (2): 2013, 2014
AFC President's Cup (1): 2012
 Tajik Supercup (1) : 2014

References

External links
 
 

1976 births
Living people
Tajikistani people of Uzbek descent
Tajikistan international footballers
Tajikistani footballers
Tajikistani expatriate footballers
Expatriate footballers in Uzbekistan
Tajikistani expatriate sportspeople in Uzbekistan
Association football goalkeepers
Vakhsh Qurghonteppa players
Tajikistan Higher League players
FC Istiklol players
Footballers at the 2014 Asian Games
Asian Games competitors for Tajikistan
Tajikistan youth international footballers